The Virginia Department of Historic Resources is the State Historic Preservation Office for the Commonwealth of Virginia. 
The agency maintains the Virginia Landmarks Register (the first step for properties and districts in Virginia seeking listing on the National Register of Historic Places). It also holds historic property easements, administers the state's historic tax credit program, and approves official highway historical markers for the state. Its headquarters are leased from and shared with the Virginia Historical Society.

References 

Historic Resources
State history organizations of the United States